Technogenesis may refer to:
 The views of Bernard Stiegler regarding the relation between humans origins and technology.
 An educational procedure by the Stevens Institute of Technology.